Blackstone is an unincorporated community in Westmoreland County, Pennsylvania, United States.

Notes

Unincorporated communities in Westmoreland County, Pennsylvania
Unincorporated communities in Pennsylvania